The Felixstowe Porte Baby (also known as the Porte F.B.2) was a British reconnaissance flying boat of the First World War, first flying in 1915.

Design and development
The Porte Baby was designed by John Cyril Porte RN at the naval air station, Felixstowe where the prototype was also built; ten more were made by May, Harden and May of Southampton. Between November 1915 and 1918 it was the largest flying boat built and flown in the United Kingdom.

The aircraft was an unequal-span, three-bay biplane of wood-and-fabric construction, the hull being mounted below the lower wing. The engines, normally three Rolls-Royce Eagles, (but sometimes with a 260 hp Green as the centre, pusher engine) were mounted between the wings; two in tractor configuration and the central one in pusher.
The two pilots were in an enclosed cockpit, the three gunners had open stations armed with machine guns.

The incongruously-named Baby was used to prove the concept of a larger aircraft carrying aloft and launching a lighter aircraft  - in this case a Bristol Scout - taking off carrying the Bristol and successfully releasing it on 17 May 1916, a technique which came to be known variously as 'composite' or 'parasitic'.

Operational history
The production Porte Babies were used to fly patrols over the North Sea from Felixstowe, RNAS Killingholme, Houton Bay, Orkney and Catfirth, Shetland. Its slow speed and large size, however, made it vulnerable to fighter attack, and after one aircraft was almost destroyed by German aircraft, being forced down and having to taxi back from off the Dutch coast to England, the Portes were kept from patrolling areas where they could encounter enemy aircraft. The Porte Baby remained in service during October 1918.

Operators

Royal Naval Air Service
Royal Air Force

Specifications

See also

Notes

References

 Porte Baby: British Aircraft Directory

External links

  including Porte Baby aircraft at RNAS Felixstowe.
 Sons of Our Empire: Film of the Royal Naval Air Service at Felixstowe, including a Porte Baby being hauled up a slipway, 1916.
 Porte Flying Boat: Film of Porte Baby (9801) at RNAS Felixstowe and in flight, released 1917.
 Flying boats over the Northern Isles: Article including the Porte Baby.

1910s British military reconnaissance aircraft
Flying boats
Porte Baby
Three-engined push-pull aircraft
Biplanes
Parasite aircraft
Aircraft first flown in 1915